5 Songs EP is the first EP by South African rock band Seether. It was released through Wind-up Records on 10 August 2002. All five songs on the EP were included on the band's debut album, Disclaimer.

Track listing

Personnel
 Shaun Morgan – guitar, vocals
 Dale Stewart – bass guitar, backing vocals
 Dave Cohoe – drums

References

2002 debut EPs
Seether albums
Wind-up Records EPs